Ousmane Diakité (born 25 July 2000) is a Malian professional footballer who plays as a midfielder for Austrian club Hartberg.

Club career
Diakité started his career with the Malian side Yeelen Olympique. In July 2018 he signed a contract with FC Red Bull Salzburg in Austria till May 2023. He also plays for the feeder team FC Liefering.

His played his first match for FC Liefering on July 27, 2018 against SV Horn. In this match he was excluded after two yellow cards in minute  39 and 92.

On 4 January 2022, Diakité's loan to Swiss club St. Gallen was terminated early to allow him to return to Red Bull and continue his rehabilitation there, after he suffered a serious knee injury in a St. Gallen game in December.

On 1 February 2023, Diakité joined Hartberg on a permanent deal, signing a contract until the summer of 2024.

National team
With the Malian U17 he became runner-up in the world championships 2015. In 2017 he played his first match for the U20 national team.

References

External links

2000 births
Living people
Malian footballers
Association football midfielders
FC Red Bull Salzburg players
FC Liefering players
SC Rheindorf Altach players
FC St. Gallen players
Austrian Football Bundesliga players
2. Liga (Austria) players
Swiss Super League players
Malian expatriate footballers
Expatriate footballers in Austria
Malian expatriate sportspeople in Austria
Expatriate footballers in Switzerland
Malian expatriate sportspeople in Switzerland
Mali under-20 international footballers
TSV Hartberg players